The 26th Kerala Film Critics Association Awards, honouring the best Malayalam films released in 2002, were announced in January 2003.

Winners

Main Awards

 Best Film: Nandanam
 Best Director: Ranjith (Nandanam)
 Best Actor: Dileep (Kunjikoonan)
 Best Actress: Navya Nair (Nandanam, Kunjikoonan)
 Second Best Film: Nammal, Yathrakarude Sradhakku)
 Second Best Actor : Prithviraj Sukumaran (Nandanam)
 Second Best Actress : Jyothirmayi (Bhavam)
 Best Popular Film : Meesha Madhavan
 Best Debut Director : Sathish Menon (Bhavam)
 Best Child Actor :Master Ashwin Thampy (Kakke Kakke Koodevide?), Master Amal Mohan (Krishnapakshakilikal)
 Best Story: Mani Shornur
 Best Screenplay: Sreenivasan (Yathrakarude Sradhakku)
 Best Lyricist: Kaithapram Damodaran Namboothiri (Yathrakarude Sradhakku)
 Best Music Director: Vidyasagar (Meesha Madhavan)
 Best Male Playback Singer: M. G. Sreekumar (Film(s): Nandanam, Aabharanacharth) (Song(s): "Manassil", "Nadavinodini")
 Best Female Playback Singer: Radhika Thilak (Film : Kunjikoonan, Song: "Omanamalare Ninmaran")

Special Awards
 Best Children's Film: Krishna Pakshakkilikkal
 Best Short Film: The Journey of Naked God (Dir: Sasikumar)
 Best Documentary: Jeevanakalayude Pulluvageetham (Dir: Venukumar)

Special Jury Awards
 Special Jury Award – Direction: Sivaprasad
 Special Jury Award – Acting: Sai Kumar

Honourary Awards 
 Chalachitra Ratnam Award: Bharat Gopy
 Chalachitra Prathibha Award: John Sankaramangalam, Kuttyedathi Vilasini, Bharanikkavu Sivakumar, Pappukutty Bhagavathar

References

2002 Indian film awards
2002